Joseph Harvey Milton Lacelle (January 18, 1918 – June 28, 1942) was a Canadian boxer who competed in the 1936 Summer Olympics.

He was born in Ottawa, Ontario. In the 1936 Berlin Olympics he was eliminated in the first round of the bantamweight class after losing his fight to eventual bronze medalist Fidel Ortiz. A member of the Royal Canadian Air Force, he was killed during a bombing raid over Berlin on June 28, 1942, and buried at the Bergen-OP-Zoom Canadian War Cemetery in Netherlands.

References

External links
Hervé Lacelle's profile at Sports Reference.com

1918 births
1942 deaths
Sportspeople from Ottawa
Boxing people from Ontario
Bantamweight boxers
Olympic boxers of Canada
Boxers at the 1936 Summer Olympics
Canadian male boxers
Royal Canadian Air Force personnel of World War II
Canadian military personnel killed in World War II
Royal Canadian Air Force officers
Military personnel from Ottawa